Mont Durand (or Arbenhorn) is a mountain in the Swiss Pennine Alps in the canton of Valais. It is located west of the Ober Gabelhorn between the valleys of Zinal and Zmutt. The Glacier Durand flows on its northern side before reaching the larger Zinal Glacier.

References

External links
Mont Durand on Hikr

Mountains of the Alps
Alpine three-thousanders
Mountains of Switzerland
Mountains of Valais